Margaret is a 2011 American epic psychological drama film  written and directed by Kenneth Lonergan. The film stars Anna Paquin, Jean Reno, Matt Damon, Mark Ruffalo, J. Smith-Cameron, Jeannie Berlin, Kieran Culkin, Olivia Thirlby, and Rosemarie DeWitt. Margaret was filmed in 2005 and originally scheduled for release that year by Fox Searchlight Pictures, but was repeatedly delayed while Lonergan struggled to create a final cut he was satisfied with, resulting in multiple lawsuits. The litigation ended in 2014.

While the studio insisted the film's running time could not exceed 150 minutes, Lonergan's preferred version was closer to three hours. Martin Scorsese and Thelma Schoonmaker contributed to editing a 165-minute version that Lonergan approved; the cut was never released because producer Gary Gilbert refused to approve it. Eventually, Fox Searchlight Pictures released the 150-minute film in a limited release in the United States on September 30, 2011, to moderately positive reviews from critics. Some considered it overlong, but it was praised for its acting and later appeared in several publications' lists of the year's best films. Critical praise has grown over time, and Margaret is now regarded as one of the best films of its decade and of the new century, and was ranked 31st in a BBC critics poll of the 21st century's 100 greatest films.

Lonergan completed a three-hour extended version incorporating extra footage with a revised score and sound mix, which was released on DVD in July 2012.

The film's title is drawn from Gerard Manley Hopkins' poem "Spring and Fall: To a Young Child", which is discussed in Lisa's English class.

Plot
A 17-year-old Manhattan student, Lisa Cohen, shopping on the Upper West Side, interacts with bus driver Gerald Maretti as she runs alongside his moving bus; he allows himself to become distracted, leading to a fatal accident by missing a red light, in which a pedestrian, Monica Patterson, is hit by the bus and subsequently dies in Lisa's arms. Initially, Lisa reports to the police that the driver had a green traffic signal, but later, out of remorse, changes her story.

Meanwhile, Lisa's life takes various turns, including a flirtation with her math teacher, Aaron Caije, her decision to lose her virginity to a classmate, Paul Hirsch, and various vehement debates with classmates about politics and terrorism. Lisa has a rocky relationship with her actress mother, with sporadic fighting and Lisa expressing ambivalence toward her mother's boyfriend Ramon.

Lisa confronts Maretti, who first pretends to have forgotten the details of the accident, and then reveals to her in anger that he does remember them, but believes he did nothing wrong, causing Lisa to pursue his firing from the company with passion. In collaboration with Monica's best friend, Emily, and cousin, Abigail, Lisa ultimately becomes involved in a wrongful death lawsuit against the Metropolitan Transit Authority, seeking the dismissal of Maretti, who has caused two previous accidents, as well as monetary damages, which would be awarded to Abigail as the victim's next of kin.

Lisa has sex with Caije, and later has an altercation with Emily, where Emily accuses Lisa of using the whole situation to give dramatic value to her life. An after-show dinner, attended by Lisa, her mother, Emily, and Ramon, ends with Ramon making a remark perceived as anti-Semitic toward Emily. Ramon dies of a heart attack not long after.

The lawsuit reaches a conclusion, with an award of $350,000, but the MTA refuses to fire Maretti, out of concern that it would inflame a labor dispute. Abigail claims the settlement offer, revealing the monetary settlement to have been her primary motivation; this causes Lisa to become very upset and disillusioned with the outcome of the case. She tracks down Caije, and in the presence of another teacher, tells him that she has had an abortion. She expresses doubt about who the father was and mentions that there are several possibilities.

Lisa and her mother plan to attend an opera that Ramon and she were to see before his death. On the way, Lisa sees Maretti driving the same bus that had killed the pedestrian and there is a brief moment where the two see each other. During the opera performance, Lisa's accumulated emotion from the sequence of events bursts out and she and her mother affectionately reconnect, crying together and holding each other as the opera goes on.

Cast
 Anna Paquin as Lisa Cohen
 J. Smith-Cameron as Joan Cohen
 Jean Reno as Ramon Cameron
 Jeannie Berlin as Emily Smith
 Allison Janney as Monica Patterson
 Matthew Broderick as John Andrew Van Tassel
 Kieran Culkin as Paul Hirsch
 Mark Ruffalo as Gerald Maretti
 Matt Damon as Aaron Caije
 Sarah Steele as Becky
 John Gallagher, Jr. as Darren Rodifer
 Stephen Adly Guirgis as Mitchell
 Betsy Aidem as Abigail
 Jonathan Hadary as Deutsch
 T. Scott Cunningham as Gary
 Josh Hamilton as Victor
 Rosemarie DeWitt as Mrs. Maretti
 Olivia Thirlby as Monica Sloane
 Kenneth Lonergan as Karl
 Michael Ealy as Dave the Lawyer
 Adam LeFevre as Rob
 Krysten Ritter as Salesgirl
 Matthew Bush as Kurt

Production
Filmed in 2005, the film's lengthy post-production sparked multiple lawsuits, which were scheduled to be tried in 2009. In July 2010, Fox Searchlight stated that Lonergan finally completed work on the film, and that it would be released in 2011.

Soundtrack
Original music was composed by Nico Muhly with additional cues by Elliott Carter.
The film also features two scenes at the Metropolitan Opera, featuring "Casta diva" from Bellini's Norma, and "Belle nuit, ô nuit d'amour" (Barcarolle) from Jacques Offenbach's Les contes d'Hoffmann.

Reception

Critical response
Margaret received mostly positive reviews from critics. , the film holds a 74% approval rating on Rotten Tomatoes, based on 100 reviews, with an average rating of 7.15 out of 10. The critical consensus states, "A surfeit of ideas contributes to Margarets excessive run time, but Anna Paquin does an admirable job of guiding viewers through emotional hell." The film also holds a score of 61 out of 100 on Metacritic (based on 27 critics), indicating "generally favorable reviews."

For her role as Lisa Cohen, Paquin shared the 2011 Best Actress Award from the London Film Critics Circle and received a nomination for Best Actress from the Chicago Film Critics Association. She placed first in critics’ polls from the LA Weekly, the Village Voice, and the International Cinephile Society.
On December 23, 2011, Fox Searchlight sent screeners of the film to AMPAS members.

Margaret earned five-star reviews from Time Out, The Daily Telegraph, and The Guardian.
It also ranked 31st in a 2016 BBC poll of the 21st century's greatest films. It has made many best of decade lists for the 2010s. In 2019, critic Richard Brody named it one of the 27 best movies of the decade.

Some critics have cited the film as an example of a great New York City movie and a portrait of a traumatized Manhattan in the wake of 9/11.

Box office
Despite being well received critically, Margaret was commercially unsuccessful. The film was given a limited release in North America in 14 theaters and earned $46,495. In the UK, it débuted on only one screen in one cinema – Odeon Panton Street in London. Such was the interest in the film that it took £4,595 in its opening weekend, giving it by some margin the highest screen average of any film on release at the time. In France, it débuted on only one screen in one cinema – Publicis Champs Elysées in Paris. The worldwide total for the film was $623,292, well below its $14 million production budget.

Legacy 
Due to critical reevaluation, Margaret is now regarded as one of the best films of its decade, and was ranked 31st in a BBC critics poll of the 21st century's 100 greatest films.

Home media
An extended cut of the film was released on DVD in July 2012 in both the UK and the US. The US release also includes a Blu-ray of the film featuring the theatrical cut in high definition. The Canadian release uses identical packaging and claims to include both cuts but, in actuality, includes only the theatrical cut twice.

References

External links
 
 
 
 
 Los Angeles Times on production of Margaret
 Margaret: A grassroots movement to try to save a movie against its distributor's will by Mike D'Angelo

2011 films
2011 drama films
American drama films
2010s English-language films
Films directed by Kenneth Lonergan
Films produced by Sydney Pollack
Films produced by Scott Rudin
Films scored by Nico Muhly
Films set in Manhattan
Films shot in New York (state)
Films with screenplays by Kenneth Lonergan
Fox Searchlight Pictures films
Films about grieving
Films about mother–daughter relationships
Films set in New York City
2010s American films